Cholermues or Cholermüs is a traditional dish from the Canton of Obwalden in Central Switzerland. It is a kind of pancake, or "shredded, fried crepe", that is typically eaten for supper.

This preparation should not be confused with Hollermus or Holdermus, which is an elderberry mash.

See also
 List of pancakes

References

Pancakes
Swiss cuisine